The Coffin Handbills were a series of pamphlets attacking Andrew Jackson during the 1828 United States presidential election. Jackson was running against incumbent John Quincy Adams. The campaign was very dirty, with multiple attacks on the character and personal history of both candidates. Many of the attacks were false.

First handbill 

Andrew Jackson had a reputation as a national hero because of his leadership during the Battle of New Orleans that was the final action of the War of 1812. His glory was turned against him when John Binns, editor and publisher of the Democratic Press in Philadelphia, published the first “coffin handbill”.  The poster showcased six black coffins at the top of the pamphlet and claimed that Jackson had ordered the execution of six militiamen during the Creek War. Another twelve coffins were displayed further down the page to represent regular soldiers and Indians who were put to death under Jackson’s command. This refers to the Battle of Horseshoe Bend, when Jackson attacked the Red Stick fortification. Roughly 800 of the 1000 Red Stick warriors were killed in the battle. There also was a drawing of Jackson assaulting and stabbing Samuel Jackson “in the streets of Nashville.”

Accusations of bigamy 
A pamphlet published at a later time accused Jackson of committing adultery with his wife. Jackson’s wife Rachel had applied for a divorce from a previous marriage in 1790.  According to Jackson, he and his wife married in 1791 and they realized two years later that her divorce was not granted until 1793, meaning that Jackson had been “married” to another man’s wife for a couple of years. In January 1794, Jackson and Rachel were legally married in a ceremony. The accusations greatly angered Jackson, which he responded to by writing to newspaper editors, suggesting how they should counter them. Jackson’s wife Rachel suffered a heart attack and died before Jackson’s inauguration. He blamed his political enemies and tensions for her death.

Accusations of cannibalism 
A "Supplemental account of some of the bloody deeds of General Jackson", attributed to Virginia Congressman John Taliaferro, accused Jackson of "atrocious and unnatural acts"; such acts including slaughtering 1,000 unarmed Native Americans, taking a nap in the midst of their corpses, and eating a dozen of them for breakfast. The author went on to speculate about how Jackson might similarly treat American governors and Congressmen were he elected president.

Background 
Tensions between Jackson and Adams had started with the 1824 presidential election, which was a four-way race between Jackson, Adams, William H. Crawford, and Henry Clay. Jackson gained a plurality of both the popular vote and the electoral vote, but no candidate had an Electoral College majority. Adams eventually won the election in the House of Representatives by making a deal with Clay that Jackson supporters dubbed the "corrupt bargain."

As a result, the 1828 rematch between Jackson and Adams was unusually acrimonious. Newspaper articles and political cartoons were the center of the attacks against each man. After Jackson's victory, the bitterness of the campaign resonated for years.  When Jackson arrived in Washington DC, he was to pay the customary courtesy call on the outgoing president, but he refused to do so. John Quincy Adams responded by refusing to go to the inauguration of Andrew Jackson.

Response 
After the “Coffin Handbill” first appeared, Jackson had his “Nashville Committee” of supporters answer the charge. They accused John Quincy Adams of serving as the Czar’s pimp while he was the American ambassador to Russia. It claimed that he had procured an American girl to sexually serve the Russian Czar. In fact Adams while Minister to Russia had employed a young girl as a maid to his wife; the girl had written a letter which had been intercepted by the Russian Postal services. Alexander I had been curious to meet the letter writer publicly at court and Adams had done so. John Quincy Adams was also attacked for allegedly having charged the government to have a billiard table put in the White House. Adams did spend a fair amount of time playing billiards, but he paid for the table with his own funds. However the bill for repairing the table had been accidentally included in the White House expense accounts.

Legacy 
Twenty-seven different versions of the Coffin Handbills have been located to date.  They all have different numbers of coffins and story configurations accusing Jackson of murder and violence. The result of allegations, the term "Coffin Handbill" became synonymous with a smear attack on political candidates.

See also 
 Andrew Jackson presidential campaign, 1828

Notes

References
Heidler, David Stephen and Heidler, Jeanne T. "Creek War," in Encyclopedia of the War of 1812, Santa Barbara, Calif. : ABC-CLIO, 1997. 
Meacham, Jon. American Lion: Andrew Jackson in the White House. New York: Random House Trade Paperback Edition, 2009. 

1828 documents
Election campaigning
Political history of the United States
United States presidential history
Andrew Jackson
Pamphlets